Borge is a Norwegian-Danish and Spanish surname. The Spanish version of the surname is a variant of Borges, or a toponymic surname from El Borge. The Norwegian-Danish version is a variant of Borg, meaning 'fortification'. Notable people with the surname include:

Danish and Norwegian
Bernhard Borge, pseudonym of André Bjerke (born 1918), Norwegian writer and poet
Brita Borge (1931–2013), Norwegian politician
Christin Borge (born 1964), Norwegian actress in television and film
Eivind N. Borge (born 1950), Norwegian politician for the Progress Party
Erik Borge (1924–2008), Norwegian film director and screenwriter
Espen Borge (born 1961), retired Norwegian runner
Mikkel Johannesen Borge (1791 - ??), Norwegian politician
Ole Borge (1916–1995), Norwegian jurist and resistance member during World War II
Victor Borge (1909–2000), Danish-American pianist and comedian
Victor Borge (bassist) (born 1965), the bassist in the Norwegian hard rock band TNT

Spanish
Roberto Borge Angulo (born 1979), Mexican politician with the Institutional Revolutionary Party
Tomás Borge (1930–2012), Nicaraguan politician
Vicente Borge (born 1968), retired Spanish footballer
Kamel Nacif Borge (born 1946), Puebla-based Mexican businessman
Miguel Borge Martín (born 1943), Mexican politician in the Institutional Revolutionary Party

References

Norwegian-language surnames